For details of museums in the United Kingdom, see:

List of museums in England
List of museums in Northern Ireland
List of museums in Scotland
List of museums in Wales

See also
List of Acts of the Parliament of the United Kingdom concerning museums
List of British railway museums
List of museums
Most visited museums in the United Kingdom